Mithun Chakraborty: The Dada of Bollywood is a biographical book about Bollywood actor Mithun Chakraborty, written by filmmaker Ram Kamal Mukherjee. The book was released by Rupa Publisher in August 2021.

References

Indian biographies
21st-century Indian books